Andrea Congreaves (born 3 June 1970) is a British former basketball player for the women's England's national team who played professionally in the United States, France, Italy, Spain, Turkey and Britain. She is the former head coach of the Rhondda Rebels of the English Women's Basketball League (Division 1), and the current head coach of the Mansfield Giants of the English Basketball League (Division 2) as well as the women's team of the University of Nottingham.

She was born in Epsom, Surrey, and graduated Carshalton High School for Girls in Carshalton, Sutton, in 1986.  She played for the Carshalton High School girls' basketball team, and through a connection with her high school coach was eventually offered an athletic scholarship to attend university in the United States.

Congreaves enrolled in Mercer University, an American private liberal arts college located in Macon, Georgia. While attending Mercer, she played for the Mercer Bears women's basketball team – the university's varsity women's team – from 1989 to 1993, and led the Lady Bears to two regular season championships in the Atlantic Sun Conference (1991, 1992).  As a junior in 1991–92, and again as a senior in 1992–93, she led National Collegiate Athletic Association (NCAA) Division I in scoring. She was a first-team all-conference selection in 1991, 1992 and 1993, and was the conference player of the year in 1992 and 1993.  After her senior season in 1992–93, she was selected as an All-American by the Women's Basketball Coaches Association (WBCA) – recognising her as one of the top ten women players in NCAA Division I college basketball. Congreaves graduated from Mercer University with a four-year bachelor of arts degree in 1993, and was inducted into the university's athletic hall of fame in 2013.

Congreaves was the first-ever British sportswoman to play in the Women's National Basketball Association (WNBA), the highest level professional league for women basketball players in the United States. After being drafted in the fourth round (26th pick overall) of the 1997 WNBA Draft, she played three seasons in the WNBA, including her first two seasons (1997–98) for the Charlotte Sting, and her final season (1999) for the Orlando Miracle. During her three WNBA seasons, she appeared in 84 of 90 games played by her teams, starting 58 of them, and scoring exactly 500 points.

Congreaves also enjoyed a successful European career in lengthy spells in Spain and Italy, as well as one-season stops in Turkey (where she contributed to the double championship of Fenerbahçe at the 1998–99 season) and France, before signing for the Rhondda Rebels for the 2005–06 season.

She was the key performer on England's national team that won the bronze medal in women's basketball at the 2006 Commonwealth Games in Melbourne, averaging 17.4 points and 9.4 rebounds per game. England defeated Nigeria 78–75 in the women's consolation final to claim third place in the Games.

Mercer statistics

Source

Career statistics

Regular season

|-
| style="text-align:left;"|1997
| style="text-align:left;"|Charlotte
| 28 || 16 || 23.5 || .500 || .409 || .768 || 4.8 || 1.5 || 0.6 || 0.2 || 1.1 || 6.7
|-
| style="text-align:left;"|1998
| style="text-align:left;"|Charlotte
| 24 || 10 || 15.5 || .432 || .294 || .905 || 3.0 || 1.5 || 0.5 || 0.2 || 1.0 || 4.3
|-
| style="text-align:left;"|1999
| style="text-align:left;"|Orlando
| 32 || 32 || 25.4 || .500 || .366 || .830 || 3.2 || 1.1 || 0.8 || 0.2 || 1.5 || 6.5
|-
| style="text-align:left;"|Career
| style="text-align:left;"|3 years, 2 teams
| 84 || 58 || 21.9 || .485 || .353 || .815 || 3.6 || 1.3 || 0.6 || 0.2 || 1.2 || 6.0

Playoffs

|-
| style="text-align:left;"|1997
| style="text-align:left;"|Charlotte
| 1 || 1 || 32.0 || .571 || .667 || .500 || 3.0 || 1.0 || 1.0 || 0.0 || 1.0 || 12.0
|-
| style="text-align:left;"|1998
| style="text-align:left;"|Charlotte
| 1 || 0 || 6.0 || .000 || .000 || — || 1.0 || 0.0 || 0.0 || 1.0 || 2.0 || 0.0
|-
| style="text-align:left;"|Career
| style="text-align:left;"|2 years, 1 team
| 2 || 1 || 19.0 || .500 || .500 || .500 || 2.0 || 0.5 || 0.5 || 0.5 || 1.5 || 6.0

See also
 List of NCAA Division I women's basketball season scoring leaders
 List of NCAA Division I women's basketball players with 2,500 points and 1,000 rebounds

References

1970 births
Living people
Basketball players at the 2006 Commonwealth Games
British expatriate basketball people in Spain
British expatriate basketball people in Turkey
British expatriate basketball people in the United States
British women's basketball players
Centers (basketball)
Charlotte Sting players
Commonwealth Games bronze medallists for England
Commonwealth Games medallists in basketball
English women's basketball players
Mercer Bears women's basketball players
Orlando Miracle players
Power forwards (basketball)
Sportspeople from Epsom
Medallists at the 2006 Commonwealth Games